Mabel Ruth Williamson was an American missionary to China. She served under the auspices of the China Inland Mission, later known as the Overseas Missionary Fellowship.

She wrote a thesis for Wheaton College "The indigenous church in the New Testament and its relation to the missionary" in 1952.

She is best known for her book Have We No Rights.

Bibliography
Mabel Williamson, Have We No Rights, Chicago: Moody Press (1957)

External links
 
 

20th-century American writers
Protestant missionaries in China
American Protestant missionaries
Female Christian missionaries
Possibly living people
20th-century American women writers
American expatriates in China